Avenging Fangs is a 1927 American silent action film directed by Ernest Van Pelt and starring Kenneth MacDonald and Helen Lynch. It was a showcase for Sandow the Dog, a prospective rival for the popular Rin Tin Tin.

Cast
 Sandow the Dog as Sandow 
 Kenneth MacDonald as Dick Mansfield 
 Helen Lynch as Mary Kirkham 
 Jack Richardson as Trigger Kincaid 
 Max Asher as Sheriff

References

Bibliography
 Jeanine Basinger. Silent Stars. Wesleyan University Press, 2000.

External links

1927 films
1920s action films
American action films
Films directed by Ernest Van Pelt
American silent feature films
1920s English-language films
American black-and-white films
Pathé Exchange films
Chesterfield Pictures films
1920s American films
Silent action films